JPEGView was a popular image viewer for Mac OS in the 1990s by Aaron Giles. Initially released in 1991, it was one of the first JPEG image viewers for Mac OS. The program was also the first postcardware. Giles said he had "received somewhere between 5,000 and 10,000 postcards". The program supported viewing JPEG files with or without QuickTime installed as well as featuring slideshows (something that Apple's PictureViewer couldn't do). JPEGView was a default helper application for a number of web browsers, including both Internet Explorer and Netscape Navigator.

The author has released the source code for JPEGView, although he retains copyright.

References

External links
 Download JPEGView - from developer Aaron Giles’ own site. Includes source code permission.
 Peter Ammon's JPEGDeux - a JPEGview clone for Mac OS X*

Macintosh-only software
Image viewers